30th Avenue station is a light rail and bus station on the Blue Line in the Twin Cities region of the U.S. state of Minnesota. The station opened with the Blue Line light rail on December 4, 2004, and the Red Line began service at the station on June 22, 2013. It has a 1,443-space park and ride facility. The south parking lot was closed for construction of a 1,443 space parking ramp, which opened in Fall 2008.

The Red Line served 30th Avenue going northbound only. Red Line service to 30th Avenue ended on May 19, 2017.

Because it was deliberately made difficult for drivers to park at the Mall of America and then ride light rail, this is an easy alternative. It is only about two blocks from the Mall of America and is much more convenient for drivers to park and ride.

The station was originally named 28th Ave Station but was renamed 30th Avenue Station in the summer of 2022 when 28th Ave was renamed to Winstead Way in honor of former Bloomington mayor, Gene Winstead. The cost to change the station name is estimated to be $15,000.

Bus connections
From 30th Avenue Station, there is a direct bus connection to Route 54 which goes to downtown Saint Paul.

References

Metro Blue Line (Minnesota) stations in Hennepin County, Minnesota
Railway stations in the United States opened in 2004
2004 establishments in Minnesota